At Your Orders, Sergeant is a 1932 German comedy film directed by Erich Schönfelder and starring Ralph Arthur Roberts, Ida Wüst and Margot Landa. It was shot at the Johannisthal Studios in Berlin. The film's sets were designed by the art directors Willi Herrmann and Herbert Lippschitz. It is a military farce set in the pre-First World War-era German Army.

Cast
Ralph Arthur Roberts
Ida Wüst
Margot Walter
Emmy Sturm
Henry Bender
Albert Paulig
Harry Halm
Paul Westermeier
Hermann Speelmans
Lotte Werkmeister

References

Bibliography 
 Klaus, Ulrich J. Deutsche Tonfilme: Jahrgang 1932. Klaus-Archiv, 1988.

External links

1930s historical comedy films
German historical comedy films
Films of the Weimar Republic
Films directed by Erich Schönfelder
Military humor in film
Films set in the 1900s
German black-and-white films
1932 comedy films
1930s German films
Films shot at Johannisthal Studios
1930s German-language films